Daviot is a village in the Highland council area of Scotland.

Etymology 
The name Daviot was recorded as Deveth in 1206–33, and is Pictish origin. The root of the name is *dem, meaning "sure, strong", sharing a derivation with the Brittonic tribal name Demetæ (> Dyfed, Wales).

References

Populated places in Inverness committee area